TSV Landsberg is a German association football club from the town of Landsberg am Lech, Bavaria.

The club's greatest success has been to win promotion to the Bayernliga on two occasions, 1997 and 2014.

History
TSV was established in November 1882 as the gymnastics club Männerturnverein 1882 Landsberg and adopted its current name around 1918. The club's footballers went their own way in 1923 as Fußball-Club 1911 Landsberg.  In 1934, FC was re-united with TSV and joined by the army club Militär-Sportverein Landsberg to create TuSpV Landsberg. After World War II occupying Allied authorities dissolved all organizations in the country, including sports and football clubs. FC and TSV were both later re-formed sometime in 1945. FC adopted the name Sportverein 1911 Landsberg in 1947 and on 31 March 1949 the club was again re-united with founding association TSV.

Throughout its existence the football team has played in lower tier local competition with the exception of a single season spent in the Oberliga Bayern (IV) in 1997–98 where the team finished at the bottom of the table. They currently play in the Bezirksoberliga Schwaben (VI) after slipping from the Landesliga Bayern-Süd (V) all the way to the Bezirksliga Schwaben-Süd (VII), gaining promotion from this league in 2006–07.

In the 2007–08 season, the TSV finished at a secure eight place in the Bezirksoberliga, the season after, it earned promotion back to the Landesliga, finishing second and beating TSV Eching 3–0 in a promotion decider. At the end of the 2011–12 season the club qualified for the promotion round to the newly expanded Bayernliga. A first round loss to FC Affing however meant the club remained in the Landesliga instead. Landsberg won the Landesliga Bayern-Südwest in 2014 and earned promotion to the Bayernliga for a second time.

Today's sports club has departments for Aikido, baseball, dance, gymnastics, handball, hiking, Karate, table tennis, and volleyball.

Geographically, the club is placed in Oberbayern but due to being very close to Schwaben, it plays in the Schwaben football league system.

Honours
The club's honours:

League
 Landesliga Bayern-Süd (V) 
 Runner-up: 1997 
 Landesliga Bayern-Südwest (VI)
 Champions: 2014
 Bezirksoberliga Schwaben (V-VII)
 Runners-up: (2) 1991, 2009
 Bezirksliga Schwaben-Süd (V-VII) 
 Champions: (3) 1971, 1986, 2007
 Runners-up: 1984
 A-Klasse Schwaben-Süd (VI)
 Champions: 1966
 A-Klasse Schwaben-Mitte (VI)
 Champions: 1983

Cup
 Schwaben Cup
 Runners-up: 1986

Recent seasons
The recent season-by-season performance of the club:

With the introduction of the Bezirksoberligas in 1988 as the new fifth tier, below the Landesligas, all leagues below dropped one tier. With the introduction of the Regionalligas in 1994 and the 3. Liga in 2008 as the new third tier, below the 2. Bundesliga, all leagues below dropped one tier. With the establishment of the Regionalliga Bayern as the new fourth tier in Bavaria in 2012 the Bayernliga was split into a northern and a southern division, the number of Landesligas expanded from three to five and the Bezirksoberligas abolished. All leagues from the Bezirksligas onwards were elevated one tier.

Source: "Das Fussball-Jahresjournal", an annual publication on football in Schwaben, author: Schwäbischer Fussball Verband (Schwaben FA)
Source:

References

Sources
Grüne, Hardy (2001). Vereinslexikon. Kassel: AGON Sportverlag

External links 
Official team site
TSV Landsberg at Weltfussball.de
Das deutsche Fußball-Archiv historical German domestic league tables (in German)

Football clubs in Germany
Football clubs in Bavaria
Association football clubs established in 1882
Football in Swabia (Bavaria)
1882 establishments in Germany
Landsberg (district)